Ueckermünde Heath is a large area of forest and heath, 1,000 km² in area, in northeastern Germany and northwestern Poland, on the  Oder river and the Szczecin Lagoon. In 1945, the eastern part went to Poland and is now called the Puszcza Wkrzańska. Świdwie Lake near Tanowo is the site of a nature reserve and Ramsar site.

Geography  
The region is about 1000 km² large. In the north it borders to the Szczecin Lagoon and in the east on the Oder. In the west the lowland of the Friedländer Großen Wiese forms the border and in the south the line Stettin-Pasewalk forms it. The Ueckermünde Heath is a lowland area, where only a few points reach heights above the 20 metre above sea level (except for: Dachsberge south of Hintersee with 48 metres). The forest area is crossed by the rivers Uecker, Randow and Zarow. There are also numerous protected moors, especially in the border area with Poland. The swamps were also the reason why the heath was colonised relatively late. In the 17th century it was mainly colonists who set up charcoal burners and glassworks. The frequent occurrence of bog iron was the basis for the metal processing plants, primarily in Torgelow. In the middle of the area there is a military training area of about 50 km², which is used by the Bundeswehr (barracks in Torgelow and Eggesin). Today, the Ueckermünde Heath is important for forestry, but also increasingly for tourism. In addition, there is a diverse flora and fauna. Since 2015 there has also been a pack of wolves and their offspring living in the Ueckermünde Heath. Cranes, screaming eagles and white-tailed eagles breed in the forests and moors.

Places in Germany:
Ahlbeck
Eggesin
Jatznick
Torgelow
Ueckermünde
Viereck
Places in Poland:
Police
Nowe Warpno
Szczecin
Trzebież

External links 

  Landschaftssteckbrief des Bundesamtes für Naturschutz

Forests of Poland
Forests and woodlands of Mecklenburg-Western Pomerania